1 November of every year is celebrated as Chhattisgarh  Rajyotsava (Chhattisgarh Foundation Day) as on this date in the year 2000 Government of India officially declared it to be an independent state. The mythological name of Chhattisgarh is Kaushal Rajya (the mother of Lord Shri Ram). The President of India gave his consent to Madhya Pradesh Reorganisation Act 2000 on 25 August and then Government of India set 1 November 2000 as the day Madhya Pradesh would be divided into Chhattisgarh and Madhya Pradesh. Since then, the state government organises 5 days festival starting 1 November of every year in the capital of Chhattisgarh, Raipur. The first event was organised at Science College, Raipur & First Chief Guest was Sonia Gandhi but from 2004 the event took place at Rajyotsava Ground, Atal Nagar till 2018 & from 2019 again it organised at Science College, Raipur to till now. The 3–5 days festival showcases a cultural extravaganza that depicts culture and tradition of Chhattisgarh and the role of tribes that the state inherit. The event has been witnessed by many political figureheads as well as Indian celebrities including Narendra Modi, Pranab Mukharjee, vocalist Sukhwinder Singh, Krishnkumar Kunnath and many others.

References

External links
Feature Article on Frontline
Chhattisgarh State Industrial Development Corporation Limited

Festivals in Chhattisgarh
Indian state foundation days